Fernando Gabriel Amorebieta Mardaras (born 29 March 1985) is a professional footballer who plays as a central defender.

He spent most of his career with Athletic Bilbao, appearing in 253 competitive matches over eight La Liga seasons and scoring four goals. He also competed professionally in England (with Fulham and Middlesbrough), Argentina and Paraguay.

Internationally, Amorebieta played for Spain (where he spent most of his early life) at youth level, but later decided to represent his country of birth Venezuela as a senior, appearing for the nation at the 2015 Copa América.

Club career

Athletic Bilbao
Born in Cantaura, Anzoátegui, Venezuela, Amorebieta joined Athletic Bilbao in 1996, aged 11; he met the club's eligibility standards having been raised in the Basque town of Iurreta and through his parents, both of whom hailed from the region. After progressing through the ranks – alongside Fernando Llorente– including CD Basconia (the farm team) and Bilbao Athletic (the reserves), he made his first-team debut in 2005–06, becoming first choice in the subsequent La Liga seasons.

Amorebieta played a total of 47 official matches in 2009–10, helping Athletic reach the round of 32 in the UEFA Europa League as well as an eighth-place finish in the league; he collected 18 yellow cards in the process, being sent off twice.

Amorebieta began the 2012–13 campaign nursing a pubalgia ailment, and was later involved in a dispute over the extension of his contract.

Fulham
On 15 April 2013, Amorebieta signed a four-year deal with Fulham on a free transfer effective as of 1 July. The Premier League club officially announced him on 22 May, and he made his debut on 14 September, coming on as a substitute for Kieran Richardson in a 1–1 draw against West Bromwich Albion at Craven Cottage.

Amorebieta was sent off on 22 March 2014 for conceding a penalty with a foul on David Silva in an eventual 5–0 defeat at Manchester City. He scored his first goal in English football on 26 April, netting his team's second in an eventual 2–2 home draw with Hull City. He made 26 competitive appearances in his debut season, which ended with relegation.

On 6 March 2015, after returning from three months out injured, Amorebieta was sent off in Fulham's 5–1 home loss by AFC Bournemouth for bringing down Callum Wilson. On the 25th, he was loaned to fellow Championship side Middlesbrough until the end of the campaign, with left-back James Husband moving in the opposite direction. He scored his first goal for the side on 8 May, replacing Lee Tomlin after 73 minutes and netting a last-minute winner for a 2–1 away win over Brentford in the play-off semi-finals; he was unused in the final at Wembley Stadium, a 2–0 defeat to Norwich City.

On 28 August 2015, Amorebieta returned to the Riverside Stadium for the entirety of the season, with Husband again being lent to Fulham for a month as part of the deal. On 1 February of the following year, however, he was recalled.

Sporting Goujón
Amorebieta returned to Spain and its top division on 22 July 2016, after agreeing to a three-year contract at Sporting de Gijón. He made his debut on 21 August, playing the full 90 minutes in a 2–1 home victory against former club Athletic.

Later years
On 10 July 2017, following Sporting's relegation, Amorebieta moved to Argentina and joined Club Atlético Independiente. In January 2019, the free agent agreed to a two-year deal at Cerro Porteño of the Paraguayan Primera División.

International career

Spain
Amorebieta was part of the Spain under-19 team that won the UEFA European Championship in 2004. In August 2008, he was called up by new senior team manager Vicente del Bosque for a friendly against Denmark, but did not leave the bench.

Venezuela
As early as 2006, Amorebieta expressed his interest in playing for the Venezuela national team. However, according to FIFA rules at the time, he should have switched his affiliation prior to the age of 21, having previously played for Spain's youth sides; FIFA removed the rule in 2009, and talks between the player and the Venezuelan Football Federation resumed.

Finally, on 2 September 2011, Amorebieta made his senior debut in a friendly with Argentina, a 1–0 loss in Kolkata. On 11 October, against the same opponent but for the 2014 FIFA World Cup qualifying campaign, he scored in a 1–0 home win, which signified Venezuela's first-ever win against the Albiceleste in the tournament.

Amorebieta was included in the squad for the 2015 Copa América, where he was sent off in the team's 1–0 defeat to Peru in the group stage for a stamp on Paolo Guerrero. He retired from international football that November.

Basque Country
Amorebieta also appeared in four matches for the Basque Country national team (a non-FIFA affiliate), debuting against Venezuela in San Cristóbal, Táchira on 20 June 2007. The friendly match, a 4–3 Basque victory, was the grand opening for the 43,000 all-seated Pueblo Nuevo Stadium, after two years of construction for the 2007 Copa América.

Career statistics

Club

International goals
Scores and results list Venezuela's goal tally first, score column indicates score after each Amorebieta goal.

Honours
Athletic Bilbao
Copa del Rey runner-up: 2008–09, 2011–12
Supercopa de España runner-up: 2009
UEFA Europa League runner-up: 2011–12

Independiente
Copa Sudamericana: 2017

Spain U19
UEFA European Under-19 Championship: 2004

See also
List of sportspeople who competed for more than one nation

References

External links

Fulham official profile

1985 births
Living people
People from Anzoátegui
Venezuelan people of Basque descent
Venezuelan people of Spanish descent
Venezuelan emigrants to Spain
Spanish footballers
Venezuelan footballers
Footballers from the Basque Country (autonomous community)
Association football defenders
La Liga players
Segunda División B players
Tercera División players
CD Basconia footballers
Bilbao Athletic footballers
Athletic Bilbao footballers
Sporting de Gijón players
Premier League players
English Football League players
Fulham F.C. players
Middlesbrough F.C. players
Argentine Primera División players
Club Atlético Independiente footballers
Paraguayan Primera División players
Cerro Porteño players
Spain youth international footballers
Venezuela international footballers
2015 Copa América players
Basque Country international footballers
Spanish expatriate footballers
Venezuelan expatriate footballers
Expatriate footballers in England
Expatriate footballers in Argentina
Expatriate footballers in Paraguay
Spanish expatriate sportspeople in England
Spanish expatriate sportspeople in Argentina
Spanish expatriate sportspeople in Paraguay
Venezuelan expatriate sportspeople in England
Venezuelan expatriate sportspeople in Argentina
Venezuelan expatriate sportspeople in Paraguay